Saint-Germain-Lavolps is a commune in the Corrèze department in central France.

Geography
The river Triouzoune forms part of the commune's southwestern aboundary; the Diège flows southeast through the commune.

Population

See also
Communes of the Corrèze department

References

Communes of Corrèze